Gonioterma fastigata is a moth of the family Depressariidae. It is found in Guyana.

The wingspan is 23–24 mm. The forewings are pale ochreous with the costal edge ochreous-yellow, margined beneath on the posterior two-thirds with deeper ochreous or fuscous suffusion, stronger and darker posteriorly. There is a suffused light brownish or fuscous streak from the middle of the base parallel with the costa to one-third. A similar better marked streak runs from the dorsum near the base to a patch on the middle of the costa, where a similar streak runs toward the tornus becoming faint in the disc and merged in a general very undefined deeper ochreous or light fuscous terminal suffusion. There is a similar less marked or nearly obsolete streak along the dorsum. The hindwings are pale whitish yellowish, with the termen suffused with ochreous yellow.

References

Moths described in 1915
Gonioterma